Richard Surland (also Surlond) (died 20 August 1509) was a canon of Windsor from 1488 to 1509

Career

He was appointed:
Rector of St Peter ad Vincula, Tower of London from 1486 to 1509
Master of St Anthony's Hospital
Sub dean of the Chapel Royal
Prebendary of Ruscomb in Salisbury Cathedral 1503

He was appointed to the ninth stall in St George's Chapel, Windsor Castle in 1488, a position he held until 1509.

A memorial brass was installed in St George's Chapel, Windsor in his memory, and sketched around 1610 by Nicholas Charles, but is now lost.

Notes 

1509 deaths
Canons of Windsor
Year of birth missing